Hindawi Programming System (hereafter referred to as HPS) is a suite of open source programming languages. It allows non-English medium literates  to learn and write computer programs. It is a scalable system which supports many programming paradigms.

Shaili Prathmik or Indic BASIC and Indic LOGO are for beginners who want to start with computer programming.

On the higher end it supports Shaili Guru (Indic C), Shaili Shraeni (Indic C++), Shaili Yantrik (Indic Assembly), Shaily Shabda (Indic Lex), Shaili Vyaakaran (Shaili Vyaaka/Indic Yacc), and Shaili Kritrim, which is an Indic programming language targeting JVM.

Mechanism and algorithms
HPS uses Romenagri transliteration to first convert the high level source code into a compiler acceptable format and then uses an existing compiler to produce machine code.

History
 The original contributor to HPS is Abhishek Choudhary who also developed APCISR and Romenagri
 Initial public release - 15 August 2004
 Release of version 2 by the ex-education minister of Bihar, Dr. Ram Prakash Mahto - 15 August 2005
 Release of Linux port under Sarai fellowship - 16 August 2006

Awards and recognition
Computer Society of India's National Young IT Professional Award 2005
Sarai / CSDS FLOSS fellowship 
Hindawi is recognised by TDIL, Government of India.
Hindawi was shortlisted for Manthan Award 2007

References

External links
 Hindawi Project on Sourceforge
 An independent review of Linux port of Hindawi
 An article on the need for Indic programming language refers to Hindawi
 Hindawi Linux (port) home page with training videos

Indic computing
Non-English-based programming languages
BASIC programming language family
Software industry in India